Krasny (masculine), Krasnaya (feminine), or Krasnoye (neuter) is the name of several inhabited localities in Russia.

Modern inhabited localities

Republic of Adygea
As of 2010, two rural localities in the Republic of Adygea bear this name:
Krasny, Republic of Adygea, a khutor in Koshekhablsky District
Krasnoye, Republic of Adygea, a selo in Teuchezhsky District

Amur Oblast
As of 2010, one rural locality in Amur Oblast bears this name:
Krasnoye, Amur Oblast, a selo in Krasnensky Rural Settlement of Tambovsky District

Arkhangelsk Oblast
As of 2010, five rural localities in Arkhangelsk Oblast bear this name:
Krasny, Arkhangelsk Oblast, a khutor in Shangalsky Selsoviet of Ustyansky District
Krasnoye, Pinezhsky District, Arkhangelsk Oblast, a village in Pokshengsky Selsoviet of Pinezhsky District
Krasnoye, Plesetsky District, Arkhangelsk Oblast, a village in Krasnovsky Selsoviet of Plesetsky District
Krasnoye, Primorsky District, Arkhangelsk Oblast, a village in Lastolsky Selsoviet of Primorsky District
Krasnaya, Arkhangelsk Oblast, a settlement in Gorkovsky Selsoviet of Verkhnetoyemsky District

Astrakhan Oblast
As of 2010, one rural locality in Astrakhan Oblast bears this name:
Krasny, Astrakhan Oblast, a settlement in Tishkovsky Selsoviet of Volodarsky District

Belgorod Oblast
As of 2010, ten rural localities in Belgorod Oblast bear this name:
Krasny, Korochansky District, Belgorod Oblast, a khutor in Korochansky District
Krasny, Rakityansky District, Belgorod Oblast, a khutor in Zinaidinsky Rural Okrug of Rakityansky District
Krasny, Shebekinsky District, Belgorod Oblast, a khutor in Shebekinsky District
Krasnoye, Alexeyevsky District, Belgorod Oblast, a selo in Alexeyevsky District
Krasnoye, Belgorodsky District, Belgorod Oblast, a selo in Belgorodsky District
Krasnoye, Krasnensky District, Belgorod Oblast, a selo in Krasnensky Rural Okrug of Krasnensky District
Krasnoye, Krasnogvardeysky District, Belgorod Oblast, a selo in Krasnogvardeysky District
Krasnoye, Prokhorovsky District, Belgorod Oblast, a selo in Prokhorovsky District
Krasnoye, Shebekinsky District, Belgorod Oblast, a settlement in Shebekinsky District
Krasnoye, Yakovlevsky District, Belgorod Oblast, a selo in Yakovlevsky District

Bryansk Oblast
As of 2010, thirteen rural localities in Bryansk Oblast bear this name:
Krasny, Klintsovsky District, Bryansk Oblast, a settlement in Velikotopalsky Selsoviet of Klintsovsky District
Krasny, Mglinsky District, Bryansk Oblast, a settlement in Oskolkovsky Selsoviet of Mglinsky District
Krasny, Pochepsky District, Bryansk Oblast, a settlement in Polnikovsky Selsoviet of Pochepsky District
Krasny, Pogarsky District, Bryansk Oblast, a settlement in Chekhovsky Selsoviet of Pogarsky District
Krasny, Starodubsky District, Bryansk Oblast, a settlement in Zankovsky Selsoviet of Starodubsky District
Krasnoye, Brasovsky District, Bryansk Oblast, a settlement in Krasninsky Selsoviet of Brasovsky District
Krasnoye, Klimovsky District, Bryansk Oblast, a settlement in Khoromensky Selsoviet of Klimovsky District
Krasnoye, Krasnogorsky District, Bryansk Oblast, a settlement in Foshnyansky Selsoviet of Krasnogorsky District
Krasnoye, Surazhsky District, Bryansk Oblast, a village in Novodrokovsky Selsoviet of Surazhsky District
Krasnoye, Trubchevsky District, Bryansk Oblast, a village in Teletsky Selsoviet of Trubchevsky District
Krasnoye, Vygonichsky District, Bryansk Oblast, a selo in Krasnoselsky Selsoviet of Vygonichsky District
Krasnaya, Karachevsky District, Bryansk Oblast, a village in Velyaminovsky Selsoviet of Karachevsky District
Krasnaya, Zhukovsky District, Bryansk Oblast, a settlement in Letoshnitsky Selsoviet of Zhukovsky District

Chelyabinsk Oblast
As of 2010, one rural locality in Chelyabinsk Oblast bears this name:
Krasny, Chelyabinsk Oblast, a settlement under the administrative jurisdiction of the city of Miass

Republic of Dagestan
As of 2010, two rural localities in the Republic of Dagestan bear this name:
Krasnoye, Khunzakhsky District, Republic of Dagestan, a selo in Kharikolinsky Selsoviet of Khunzakhsky District
Krasnoye, Kizlyarsky District, Republic of Dagestan, a selo in Bolsheareshevsky Selsoviet of Kizlyarsky District

Ivanovo Oblast
As of 2010, four rural localities in Ivanovo Oblast bear this name:
Krasnoye, Ivanovsky District, Ivanovo Oblast, a village in Ivanovsky District
Krasnoye, Palekhsky District, Ivanovo Oblast, a selo in Palekhsky District
Krasnoye, Rodnikovsky District, Ivanovo Oblast, a selo in Rodnikovsky District
Krasnaya, Ivanovo Oblast, a village in Palekhsky District

Kaliningrad Oblast
As of 2010, four rural localities in Kaliningrad Oblast bear this name:
Krasnoye, Guryevsky District, Kaliningrad Oblast, a settlement in Nizovsky Rural Okrug of Guryevsky District
Krasnoye, Polessky District, Kaliningrad Oblast, a settlement in Golovkinsky Rural Okrug of Polessky District
Krasnoye, Pravdinsky District, Kaliningrad Oblast, a settlement in Mozyrsky Rural Okrug of Pravdinsky District
Krasnoye, Slavsky District, Kaliningrad Oblast, a settlement in Bolshakovsky Rural Okrug of Slavsky District

Kaluga Oblast
As of 2010, four rural localities in Kaluga Oblast bear this name:
Krasnoye, Borovsky District, Kaluga Oblast, a village in Borovsky District
Krasnoye, Khvastovichsky District, Kaluga Oblast, a selo in Khvastovichsky District
Krasnoye, Sukhinichsky District, Kaluga Oblast, a selo in Sukhinichsky District
Krasnoye, Zhizdrinsky District, Kaluga Oblast, a village in Zhizdrinsky District

Kamchatka Krai
As of 2010, one rural locality in Kamchatka Krai bears this name:
Krasny, Kamchatka Krai, a settlement in Yelizovsky District

Kemerovo Oblast
As of 2010, one rural locality in Kemerovo Oblast bears this name:
Krasnoye, Kemerovo Oblast, a selo in Krasninskaya Rural Territory of Leninsk-Kuznetsky District

Khabarovsk Krai
As of 2010, one rural locality in Khabarovsk Krai bears this name:
Krasnoye, Khabarovsk Krai, a selo in Nikolayevsky District

Kirov Oblast
As of 2010, four rural localities in Kirov Oblast bear this name:
Krasnoye, Darovskoy District, Kirov Oblast, a selo in Luzyansky Rural Okrug of Darovskoy District
Krasnoye, Falyonsky District, Kirov Oblast, a selo in Verkhosunsky Rural Okrug of Falyonsky District
Krasnoye, Kotelnichsky District, Kirov Oblast, a village in Chistopolsky Rural Okrug of Kotelnichsky District
Krasnoye, Lebyazhsky District, Kirov Oblast, a selo in Krasnoyarsky Rural Okrug of Lebyazhsky District

Komi Republic
As of 2010, one rural locality in the Komi Republic bears this name:
Krasnaya, Komi Republic, a village in Chasovo selo Administrative Territory of Syktyvdinsky District

Kostroma Oblast
As of 2010, one rural locality in Kostroma Oblast bears this name:
Krasny, Kostroma Oblast, a khutor in Znamenskoye Settlement of Manturovsky District

Krasnodar Krai
As of 2010, eighteen rural localities in Krasnodar Krai bear this name:
Krasny, Anapsky District, Krasnodar Krai, a khutor in Primorsky Rural Okrug of Anapsky District
Krasny, Moldavansky Rural Okrug, Krymsky District, Krasnodar Krai, a khutor in Moldavansky Rural Okrug of Krymsky District
Krasny, Yuzhny Rural Okrug, Krymsky District, Krasnodar Krai, a khutor in Yuzhny Rural Okrug of Krymsky District
Krasny, Kurganinsky District, Krasnodar Krai, a settlement in Mikhaylovsky Rural Okrug of Kurganinsky District
Krasny, Shkurinsky Rural Okrug, Kushchyovsky District, Krasnodar Krai, a khutor in Shkurinsky Rural Okrug of Kushchyovsky District
Krasny, Srednechuburksky Rural Okrug, Kushchyovsky District, Krasnodar Krai, a khutor in Srednechuburksky Rural Okrug of Kushchyovsky District
Krasny, Labinsky District, Krasnodar Krai, a settlement in Voznesensky Rural Okrug of Labinsky District
Krasny, Pavlovsky District, Krasnodar Krai, a khutor in Severny Rural Okrug of Pavlovsky District
Krasny, Primorsko-Akhtarsky District, Krasnodar Krai, a khutor in Stepnoy Rural Okrug of Primorsko-Akhtarsky District
Krasny, Seversky District, Krasnodar Krai, a khutor in Lvovsky Rural Okrug of Seversky District
Krasny, Tikhoretsky District, Krasnodar Krai, a khutor in Khopersky Rural Okrug of Tikhoretsky District
Krasny, Poselkovy Rural Okrug, Timashyovsky District, Krasnodar Krai, a settlement in Poselkovy Rural Okrug of Timashyovsky District
Krasny, Rogovsky Rural Okrug, Timashyovsky District, Krasnodar Krai, a khutor in Rogovsky Rural Okrug of Timashyovsky District
Krasny, Ust-Labinsky District, Krasnodar Krai, a khutor in Alexandrovsky Rural Okrug of Ust-Labinsky District
Krasny, Vyselkovsky District, Krasnodar Krai, a settlement in Gazyrsky Rural Okrug of Vyselkovsky District
Krasnoye (khutor), Krasnoselsky Rural Okrug, Kushchyovsky District, Krasnodar Krai, a khutor in Krasnoselsky Rural Okrug of Kushchyovsky District
Krasnoye (selo), Krasnoselsky Rural Okrug, Kushchyovsky District, Krasnodar Krai, a selo in Krasnoselsky Rural Okrug of Kushchyovsky District
Krasnoye, Tuapsinsky District, Krasnodar Krai, a selo in Velyaminovsky Rural Okrug of Tuapsinsky District

Krasnoyarsk Krai
As of 2010, one rural locality in Krasnoyarsk Krai bears this name:
Krasnaya, Krasnoyarsk Krai, a village in Krasnensky Selsoviet of Balakhtinsky District

Kursk Oblast
As of 2010, four rural localities in Kursk Oblast bear this name:
Krasny, Oboyansky District, Kursk Oblast, a settlement in Pavlovsky Selsoviet of Oboyansky District
Krasny, Zheleznogorsky District, Kursk Oblast, a settlement in Rastorogsky Selsoviet of Zheleznogorsky District
Krasnoye, Medvensky District, Kursk Oblast, a khutor in Kitayevsky Selsoviet of Medvensky District
Krasnoye, Solntsevsky District, Kursk Oblast, a khutor in Chermoshnyansky Selsoviet of Solntsevsky District

Leningrad Oblast
As of 2010, one rural locality in Leningrad Oblast bears this name:
Krasnoye, Leningrad Oblast, a logging depot settlement in Plodovskoye Settlement Municipal Formation of Priozersky District

Lipetsk Oblast
As of 2010, seven rural localities in Lipetsk Oblast bear this name:
Krasny, Lipetsk Oblast, a settlement in Znamensky Selsoviet of Lev-Tolstovsky District
Krasnoye, Dankovsky District, Lipetsk Oblast, a village in Voskresensky Selsoviet of Dankovsky District
Krasnoye, Dolgorukovsky District, Lipetsk Oblast, a selo in Dolgorukovsky Selsoviet of Dolgorukovsky District
Krasnoye, Krasninsky District, Lipetsk Oblast, a selo in Krasninsky Selsoviet of Krasninsky District
Krasnoye, Lipetsky District, Lipetsk Oblast, a village in Pruzhinsky Selsoviet of Lipetsky District
Krasnoye, Usmansky District, Lipetsk Oblast, a selo in Storozhevskoy Selsoviet of Usmansky District
Krasnaya, Lipetsk Oblast, a village in Dubovetsky Selsoviet of Dolgorukovsky District

Republic of Mordovia
As of 2010, two rural localities in the Republic of Mordovia bear this name:
Krasny, Staroshaygovsky District, Republic of Mordovia, a settlement in Staroshaygovsky Selsoviet of Staroshaygovsky District
Krasny, Temnikovsky District, Republic of Mordovia, a settlement in Zhegalovsky Selsoviet of Temnikovsky District

Moscow Oblast
As of 2010, seven rural localities in Moscow Oblast bear this name:
Krasny, Moscow Oblast, a settlement in Bukarevskoye Rural Settlement of Istrinsky District
Krasnoye, Domodedovo, Moscow Oblast, a village under the administrative jurisdiction of the Domodedovo City Under Oblast Jurisdiction
Krasnoye (selo), Dorokhovskoye Rural Settlement, Orekhovo-Zuyevsky District, Moscow Oblast, a selo in Dorokhovskoye Rural Settlement of Orekhovo-Zuyevsky District
Krasnoye (village), Dorokhovskoye Rural Settlement, Orekhovo-Zuyevsky District, Moscow Oblast, a village in Dorokhovskoye Rural Settlement of Orekhovo-Zuyevsky District
Krasnoye (selo), Krasnopakhorskoye Rural Settlement, Podolsky District, Moscow Oblast, a selo in Krasnopakhorskoye Rural Settlement of Podolsky District
Krasnoye (settlement), Krasnopakhorskoye Rural Settlement, Podolsky District, Moscow Oblast, a settlement in Krasnopakhorskoye Rural Settlement of Podolsky District
Krasnoye, Serebryano-Prudsky District, Moscow Oblast, a selo under the administrative jurisdiction of  the work settlement of  Serebryanye Prudy, Serebryano-Prudsky District

Nenets Autonomous Okrug
As of 2010, one rural locality in Nenets Autonomous Okrug bears this name:
Krasnoye, Nenets Autonomous Okrug, a settlement in Primorsko-Kuysky Selsoviet of Zapolyarny District

Nizhny Novgorod Oblast
As of 2010, five rural localities in Nizhny Novgorod Oblast bear this name:
Krasny, Nizhny Novgorod Oblast, a settlement in Sovetsky Selsoviet of Bolshemurashkinsky District
Krasnoye, Arzamassky District, Nizhny Novgorod Oblast, a selo in Krasnoselsky Selsoviet of Arzamassky District
Krasnoye, Sechenovsky District, Nizhny Novgorod Oblast, a selo in Sechenovsky Selsoviet of Sechenovsky District
Krasnoye, Sosnovsky District, Nizhny Novgorod Oblast, a village in Yakovsky Selsoviet of Sosnovsky District
Krasnoye, Voskresensky District, Nizhny Novgorod Oblast, a village in Blagoveshchensky Selsoviet of Voskresensky District

Novgorod Oblast
As of 2010, three rural localities in Novgorod Oblast bear this name:
Krasnoye, Malovishersky District, Novgorod Oblast, a village in Burginskoye Settlement of Malovishersky District
Krasnoye, Maryovsky District, Novgorod Oblast, a village in Velilskoye Settlement of Maryovsky District
Krasnaya, Novgorod Oblast, a village in Zhirkovskoye Settlement of Demyansky District

Novosibirsk Oblast
As of 2010, one rural locality in Novosibirsk Oblast bears this name:
Krasnoye, Novosibirsk Oblast, a selo in Chanovsky District

Orenburg Oblast
As of 2010, one rural locality in Orenburg Oblast bears this name:
Krasnoye, Orenburg Oblast, a selo in Krasnovsky Selsoviet of Pervomaysky District

Oryol Oblast
As of 2010, ten rural localities in Oryol Oblast bear this name:
Krasny, Kudinovsky Selsoviet, Dolzhansky District, Oryol Oblast, a settlement in Kudinovsky Selsoviet of Dolzhansky District
Krasny, Urynovsky Selsoviet, Dolzhansky District, Oryol Oblast, a settlement in Urynovsky Selsoviet of Dolzhansky District
Krasny, Kolpnyansky District, Oryol Oblast, a settlement in Krutovsky Selsoviet of Kolpnyansky District
Krasny, Livensky District, Oryol Oblast, a settlement in Nikolsky Selsoviet of Livensky District
Krasny, Mtsensky District, Oryol Oblast, a settlement in Anikanovsky Selsoviet of Mtsensky District
Krasny, Droskovsky Selsoviet, Pokrovsky District, Oryol Oblast, a settlement in Droskovsky Selsoviet of Pokrovsky District
Krasny, Retinsky Selsoviet, Pokrovsky District, Oryol Oblast, a settlement in Retinsky Selsoviet of Pokrovsky District
Krasnoye, Kolpnyansky District, Oryol Oblast, a selo in Krasnyansky Selsoviet of Kolpnyansky District
Krasnoye, Verkhovsky District, Oryol Oblast, a selo in Telyazhensky Selsoviet of Verkhovsky District
Krasnoye, Zalegoshchensky District, Oryol Oblast, a selo in Krasnensky Selsoviet of Zalegoshchensky District

Penza Oblast
As of 2010, four rural localities in Penza Oblast bear this name:
Krasny, Bashmakovsky District, Penza Oblast, a settlement in Sosnovsky Selsoviet of Bashmakovsky District
Krasny, Gorodishchensky District, Penza Oblast, a settlement in Kanayevsky Selsoviet of Gorodishchensky District
Krasny, Nizhnelomovsky District, Penza Oblast, a settlement in Atmissky Selsoviet of Nizhnelomovsky District
Krasnoye, Penza Oblast, a selo in Usovsky Selsoviet of Nikolsky District

Perm Krai
As of 2010, one rural locality in Perm Krai bears this name:
Krasnoye, Perm Krai, a settlement under the administrative jurisdiction of the city of krai significance of Dobryanka

Pskov Oblast
As of 2010, one rural locality in Pskov Oblast bears this name:
Krasnoye, Pskov Oblast, a village in Pustoshkinsky District

Rostov Oblast
As of 2010, four rural localities in Rostov Oblast bear this name:
Krasny, Aksaysky District, Rostov Oblast, a settlement in Shchepkinskoye Rural Settlement of Aksaysky District
Krasny, Bagayevsky District, Rostov Oblast, a khutor in Krasnenskoye Rural Settlement of Bagayevsky District
Krasny, Neklinovsky District, Rostov Oblast, a khutor in Andreyevo-Melentyevskoye Rural Settlement of Neklinovsky District
Krasny, Oktyabrsky District, Rostov Oblast, a khutor in Krasyukovskoye Rural Settlement of Oktyabrsky District

Ryazan Oblast
As of 2010, twelve rural localities in Ryazan Oblast bear this name:
Krasny, Chuchkovsky District, Ryazan Oblast, a settlement in Protasyevo-Uglyansky Rural Okrug of Chuchkovsky District
Krasny, Miloslavsky District, Ryazan Oblast, a settlement in Bolshepodovechinsky Rural Okrug of Miloslavsky District
Krasny, Sasovsky District, Ryazan Oblast, a settlement in Pridorozhny Rural Okrug of Sasovsky District
Krasny, Shatsky District, Ryazan Oblast, a settlement in Kazachinsky Rural Okrug of Shatsky District
Krasny, Shilovsky District, Ryazan Oblast, a settlement in Berezovsky Rural Okrug of Shilovsky District
Krasny, Skopinsky District, Ryazan Oblast, a settlement in Lopatinsky Rural Okrug of Skopinsky District
Krasny, Ukholovsky District, Ryazan Oblast, a settlement in Kalininsky Rural Okrug of Ukholovsky District
Krasnoye, Krasnovsky Rural Okrug, Mikhaylovsky District, Ryazan Oblast, a selo in Krasnovsky Rural Okrug of Mikhaylovsky District
Krasnoye, Zhmurovsky Rural Okrug, Mikhaylovsky District, Ryazan Oblast, a village in Zhmurovsky Rural Okrug of Mikhaylovsky District
Krasnoye, Alexandro-Nevsky District, Ryazan Oblast, a selo in Burminsky Rural Okrug of Alexandro-Nevsky District
Krasnoye, Pronsky District, Ryazan Oblast, a selo in Alyutovsky Rural Okrug of Pronsky District
Krasnoye, Sapozhkovsky District, Ryazan Oblast, a selo in Nikolsky Rural Okrug of Sapozhkovsky District

Saratov Oblast
As of 2010, two rural localities in Saratov Oblast bear this name:
Krasny, Arkadaksky District, Saratov Oblast, a settlement in Arkadaksky District
Krasny, Samoylovsky District, Saratov Oblast, a settlement in Samoylovsky District

Smolensk Oblast
As of 2010, five inhabited localities in Smolensk Oblast bear this name:

Urban localities
Krasny, Krasninsky District, Smolensk Oblast, a settlement under the administrative jurisdiction of  Krasninskoye Urban Settlement of Krasninsky District

Rural localities
Krasny, Roslavlsky District, Smolensk Oblast, a settlement in Lyubovskoye Rural Settlement of Roslavlsky District
Krasnoye, Khislavichsky District, Smolensk Oblast, a village in Vladimirovskoye Rural Settlement of Khislavichsky District
Krasnoye, Krasninsky District, Smolensk Oblast, a station in Krasnovskoye Rural Settlement of Krasninsky District
Krasnoye, Ugransky District, Smolensk Oblast, a village in Znamenskoye Rural Settlement of Ugransky District

Stavropol Krai
As of 2010, one rural locality in Stavropol Krai bears this name:
Krasnoye, Stavropol Krai, a selo in Krasny Selsoviet of Grachyovsky District

Sverdlovsk Oblast
As of 2010, one rural locality in Sverdlovsk Oblast bears this name:
Krasny, Sverdlovsk Oblast, a settlement under the administrative jurisdiction of the city of Verkhnyaya Pyshma

Tambov Oblast
As of 2010, six rural localities in Tambov Oblast bear this name:
Krasny, Kirsanovsky District, Tambov Oblast, a settlement in Leninsky Selsoviet of Kirsanovsky District
Krasny, Morshansky District, Tambov Oblast, a settlement in Novotomnikovsky Selsoviet of Morshansky District
Krasny, Petrovsky District, Tambov Oblast, a settlement in Pervomaysky Selsoviet of Petrovsky District
Krasny, Rzhaksinsky District, Tambov Oblast, a settlement in Kamensky Selsoviet of Rzhaksinsky District
Krasny, Tokaryovsky District, Tambov Oblast, a settlement in Lvovsky Selsoviet of Tokaryovsky District
Krasny, Uvarovsky District, Tambov Oblast, a settlement in Berezovsky Selsoviet of Uvarovsky District

Tula Oblast
As of 2010, sixteen rural localities in Tula Oblast bear this name:
Krasny, Arsenyevsky District, Tula Oblast, a settlement in Golubochensky Rural Okrug of Arsenyevsky District
Krasny, Bogoroditsky District, Tula Oblast, a settlement in Bakhmetyevsky Rural Okrug of Bogoroditsky District
Krasny, Kamensky District, Tula Oblast, a settlement in Soklakovsky Rural Okrug of Kamensky District
Krasny, Kurkinsky District, Tula Oblast, a settlement in Samarskaya Volost of Kurkinsky District
Krasny, Plavsky District, Tula Oblast, a settlement in Prigorodny Rural Okrug of Plavsky District
Krasny, Shchyokinsky District, Tula Oblast, a settlement in Kostomarovskaya Rural Administration of Shchyokinsky District
Krasny, Venyovsky District, Tula Oblast, a settlement in Dyakonovsky Rural Okrug of Venyovsky District
Krasnoye, Aleksinsky District, Tula Oblast, a village in Michurinsky Rural Okrug of Aleksinsky District
Krasnoye, Arsenyevsky District, Tula Oblast, a selo in Yasenkovsky Rural Okrug of Arsenyevsky District
Krasnoye, Chernsky District, Tula Oblast, a village in Molchanovskaya Rural Administration of Chernsky District
Krasnoye, Kimovsky District, Tula Oblast, a village in Buchalsky Rural Okrug of Kimovsky District
Krasnoye, Odoyevsky District, Tula Oblast, a selo in Apukhtinskaya Rural Administration of Odoyevsky District
Krasnoye, Meshcherinsky Rural Okrug, Plavsky District, Tula Oblast, a village in Meshcherinsky Rural Okrug of Plavsky District
Krasnoye, Oktyabrsky Rural Okrug, Plavsky District, Tula Oblast, a selo in Oktyabrsky Rural Okrug of Plavsky District
Krasnoye, Tyoplo-Ogaryovsky District, Tula Oblast, a village in Pokrovsky Rural Okrug of Tyoplo-Ogaryovsky District
Krasnaya, Tula Oblast, a village in Novoselsky Rural Okrug of Kireyevsky District

Tver Oblast
As of 2010, nine rural localities in Tver Oblast bear this name:
Krasnoye, Kalyazinsky District, Tver Oblast, a village in Kalyazinsky District
Krasnoye, Kimrsky District, Tver Oblast, a selo in Kimrsky District
Krasnoye, Rameshkovsky District, Tver Oblast, a village in Rameshkovsky District
Krasnoye, Rzhevsky District, Tver Oblast, a village in Rzhevsky District
Krasnoye, Staritsky District, Tver Oblast, a village in Staritsky District
Krasnoye, Torzhoksky District, Tver Oblast, a selo in Torzhoksky District
Krasnoye, Udomelsky District, Tver Oblast, a village in Udomelsky District
Krasnoye, Vesyegonsky District, Tver Oblast, a village in Vesyegonsky District
Krasnoye, Vyshnevolotsky District, Tver Oblast, a village in Vyshnevolotsky District

Tyumen Oblast
As of 2010, one rural locality in Tyumen Oblast bears this name:
Krasnaya, Tyumen Oblast, a village in Zavodoukovsky District

Udmurt Republic
As of 2010, two rural localities in the Udmurt Republic bear this name:
Krasny, Udmurt Republic, a khutor in Bolsheoshvortsinsky Selsoviet of Yakshur-Bodyinsky District
Krasnoye, Udmurt Republic, a selo in Krasny Selsoviet of Uvinsky District

Ulyanovsk Oblast
As of 2010, one rural locality in Ulyanovsk Oblast bears this name:
Krasny, Ulyanovsk Oblast, a settlement in Krasnoselsky Rural Okrug of Novospassky District

Vladimir Oblast
As of 2010, two rural localities in Vladimir Oblast bear this name:
Krasnoye, Suzdalsky District, Vladimir Oblast, a selo in Suzdalsky District
Krasnoye, Yuryev-Polsky District, Vladimir Oblast, a selo in Yuryev-Polsky District

Volgograd Oblast
As of 2010, five rural localities in Volgograd Oblast bear this name:
Krasny, Chernyshkovsky District, Volgograd Oblast, a settlement in Krasnoyarsky Selsoviet of Chernyshkovsky District
Krasny, Danilovsky District, Volgograd Oblast, a khutor in Krasninsky Selsoviet of Danilovsky District
Krasny, Sredneakhtubinsky District, Volgograd Oblast, a settlement in Kuybyshevsky Selsoviet of Sredneakhtubinsky District
Krasny, Uryupinsky District, Volgograd Oblast, a khutor in Krasnyansky Selsoviet of Uryupinsky District
Krasny, Yelansky District, Volgograd Oblast, a settlement under the administrative jurisdiction of  the urban-type settlement of  Yelan, Yelansky District

Vologda Oblast
As of 2010, seven rural localities in Vologda Oblast bear this name:
Krasnoye, Gryazovetsky District, Vologda Oblast, a village in Lezhsky Selsoviet of Gryazovetsky District
Krasnoye, Andronovsky Selsoviet, Kaduysky District, Vologda Oblast, a village in Andronovsky Selsoviet of Kaduysky District
Krasnoye, Velikoselsky Selsoviet, Kaduysky District, Vologda Oblast, a village in Velikoselsky Selsoviet of Kaduysky District
Krasnoye, Sheksninsky District, Vologda Oblast, a village in Zheleznodorozhny Selsoviet of Sheksninsky District
Krasnoye, Tarnogsky District, Vologda Oblast, a selo in Zaborsky Selsoviet of Tarnogsky District
Krasnoye, Totemsky District, Vologda Oblast, a selo in Manylovsky Selsoviet of Totemsky District
Krasnoye, Vologodsky District, Vologda Oblast, a village in Sosnovsky Selsoviet of Vologodsky District

Voronezh Oblast
As of 2010, eleven rural localities in Voronezh Oblast bear this name:
Krasny, Anninsky District, Voronezh Oblast, a settlement in Krasnologskoye Rural Settlement of Anninsky District
Krasny, Oktyabrskoye Rural Settlement, Bobrovsky District, Voronezh Oblast, a settlement in Oktyabrskoye Rural Settlement of Bobrovsky District
Krasny, Yudanovskoye Rural Settlement, Bobrovsky District, Voronezh Oblast, a settlement in Yudanovskoye Rural Settlement of Bobrovsky District
Krasny, Berezovskoye Rural Settlement, Buturlinovsky District, Voronezh Oblast, a settlement in Berezovskoye Rural Settlement of Buturlinovsky District
Krasny, Puzevskoye Rural Settlement, Buturlinovsky District, Voronezh Oblast, a settlement in Puzevskoye Rural Settlement of Buturlinovsky District
Krasny, Podgorensky District, Voronezh Oblast, a khutor in Vitebskoye Rural Settlement of Podgorensky District
Krasny, Semiluksky District, Voronezh Oblast, a khutor in Medvezhenskoye Rural Settlement of Semiluksky District
Krasny, Talovsky District, Voronezh Oblast, a settlement in Kazanskoye Rural Settlement of Talovsky District
Krasnoye, Novokhopyorsky District, Voronezh Oblast, a selo in Krasnyanskoye Rural Settlement of Novokhopyorsky District
Krasnoye, Paninsky District, Voronezh Oblast, a selo in Krasnenskoye Rural Settlement of Paninsky District
Krasnoye, Ramonsky District, Voronezh Oblast, a khutor in Aydarovskoye Rural Settlement of Ramonsky District

Yaroslavl Oblast
As of 2010, ten rural localities in Yaroslavl Oblast bear this name:
Krasnoye, Nekouzsky District, Yaroslavl Oblast, a selo in Stanilovsky Rural Okrug of Nekouzsky District
Krasnoye, Pereslavsky District, Yaroslavl Oblast, a selo in Dobrilovsky Rural Okrug of Pereslavsky District
Krasnoye, Krasnovsky Rural Okrug, Poshekhonsky District, Yaroslavl Oblast, a selo in Krasnovsky Rural Okrug of Poshekhonsky District
Krasnoye, Vasilyevsky Rural Okrug, Poshekhonsky District, Yaroslavl Oblast, a selo in Vasilyevsky Rural Okrug of Poshekhonsky District
Krasnoye, Rybinsky District, Yaroslavl Oblast, a selo in Oktyabrsky Rural Okrug of Rybinsky District
Krasnoye (railway station), Maymersky Rural Okrug, Uglichsky District, Yaroslavl Oblast, a railway station in Maymersky Rural Okrug of Uglichsky District
Krasnoye (selo), Maymersky Rural Okrug, Uglichsky District, Yaroslavl Oblast, a selo in Maymersky Rural Okrug of Uglichsky District
Krasnoye, Otradnovsky Rural Okrug, Uglichsky District, Yaroslavl Oblast, a selo in Otradnovsky Rural Okrug of Uglichsky District
Krasnoye, Ryutnevsky Rural Okrug, Yaroslavsky District, Yaroslavl Oblast, a settlement in Ryutnevsky Rural Okrug of Yaroslavsky District
Krasnoye, Tunoshensky Rural Okrug, Yaroslavsky District, Yaroslavl Oblast, a selo in Tunoshensky Rural Okrug of Yaroslavsky District

Historical inhabited localities
Krasny, former urban-type settlement in Rostov Oblast; since 2004—a part of the town of Novoshakhtinsk

de:Krasnoje
nl:Krasnoje
pl:Krasnoje
ru:Красное